Dibyendu Barua (born 27 October 1966) is an Indian chess grandmaster. He is a three-time Indian Chess Champion. He was the second Indian, after Viswanathan Anand, second Bengali after Niaz Murshed, and third South Asian after Niaz and Anand to achieve the title of chess grandmaster.

Chess career
Barua is from Kolkata in the Indian state of West Bengal. In 1978, Barua, as a 12-year-old, became the youngest participant in the Indian Chess Championship. In 1982, Barua defeated the then-world number two ranked Viktor Korchnoi in London. He was awarded the Grandmaster title in 1991 by FIDE, becoming the second Indian to achieve the title, after Viswanathan Anand. In 1983, he won the Indian Chess Championship for the first time. He has since won it twice more, in 1998 and 2001.

References

External links

1966 births
Living people
Chess grandmasters
Chess Olympiad competitors
Indian chess players
Recipients of the Arjuna Award
Hare School alumni